The Bush Brother was a quarterly English-language journal produced by the religious order of the Brotherhood of the Good Shepherd based in Dubbo, New South Wales, Australia. The focus of the publication was mainly religion and missionary work with issues often containing photographs of rural and remote areas of Australian and its people.

Publication history 
The Brotherhood of the Good Shepherd published The Bush Brother from 1904 to 1980. Frederick Henry Campion founded the journal in September 1904 and he described the focus of the publication as "...a quarterly magazine, issued to friends and subscribers in Australia and England, and to those who live in the districts we work. Its object is to describe the work of the Brotherhood for each quarter, recording baptisms and weddings, etc., giving a quarterly balance-sheet, and containing articles from the brethren describing their work for the past quarter. It will also contain a sermon and other spiritual help for those living in the bush."

It was originally priced at three pence an issue.

The Bush Brotherhood had its origins in the Bishop of Rockhampton's settlement at Longreach in Central Queensland known as St. Andrew's Bush Brotherhood. Its success led to the formation of three more Bush Brotherhoods at Herberton, Charleville and Dubbo.

Digitisation 
The Bush Brother has been digitised in Trove by the National Library of Australia.

See also 
 Bush Brotherhood also known as the Brotherhood of the Good Shepherd

References

External links 
 The Bush brother: a quarterly paper  
 Frederick Henry Campion in the Australian Dictionary of Biography

1904 establishments in Australia
1980 disestablishments in Australia
Defunct magazines published in Australia
Religious magazines
Magazines disestablished in 1980
Magazines established in 1904
Dubbo